Eudalaca holophaea is a species of moth of the family Hepialidae. It is known from the Democratic Republic of Congo.

References

External links
Hepialidae genera

Moths described in 1910
Hepialidae
Endemic fauna of the Democratic Republic of the Congo